Sobolevsky (masculine), Sobolevskaya (feminine), or Sobolevskoye (neuter) is the name of several rural localities in Russia:
Sobolevsky, Krasnodar Krai, a khutor in Prikubansky Rural Okrug of Slavyansky District of Krasnodar Krai
Sobolevsky, Mari El Republic, a settlement in Azyakovsky Rural Okrug of Medvedevsky District of the Mari El Republic
Sobolevskoye, a selo in Verkhneuslonsky District of the Republic of Tatarstan
Sobolevskaya, Arkhangelsk Oblast, a village in Bestuzhevsky Selsoviet of Ustyansky District of Arkhangelsk Oblast